Sketch is a 2018 Indian Tamil-language action film written and directed by Vijay Chandar and produced by Moving Frame. The film features Vikram and Tamannaah in the leading roles for the first time, with Soori, Jangiri Madhumitha, Baburaj and R. K. Suresh among others portraying supporting roles. The film was released on 12 January 2018 to positive reviews and was a commercial success.

Plot 
Jeeva aka Sketch lives with his uncle Dorai, who used to tow and bring back vehicles for which the monthly EMI had not been paid. However, during a fight, he loses his hand, and Sketch is provided with the job, who does his day-to-day job perfectly. Dorai's right-hand Ravi wanted to take over the business. However, Bhaskar "Boss" Settu agrees with Sketch coming up to the position. 

At a college, Sketch tows a scooter that belonged to Priya, Ammu's friend. The next day, he happens to meet her on a bus. When some other guy tries to harass her, Sketch bats away his hand, where the bus stops quickly, causing Sketch to bump into Ammu. She mistakes this as him trying to make advances on her and yells at him, only later does she realise that he was trying to protect her, and she falls for him. 

One day, Sketch loses a bike while bringing it back to the garage. The owner gets enraged and demands  from Settu. Sketch realises that this was a plot by Ravi to embarrass him, where he faces them to retrieve the money and the stolen bike, which earns back Settu's trust, and they celebrate. Settu reveals that his father was insulted by a local goon named Royapuram Kumar, where he asks Sketch to sketch a plan to steal Kumar's car. 

Sketch steals Kumar's car and ends up in a goose chase with police that ends with Sketch creating a rivalry with Kumar. Kumar brings a gang from another state to finish off Sketch and his team, where after one by one, Sketch's friends are killed, and Sketch is confused about who the killer is. 

Later, Sketch is confronted by the boys, who were working along with Sketch in Settu's garage. The boys reveal that they planned and killed Sketch's friends out of jealousy to take Sketch's position. Sketch forgives them and protects the boys from police by helping them escape, where the film ends with a moral: avoid child labour.

Cast

Vikram as Jeeva (Sketch)
Tamannaah as Amuthavalli 
Soori as Maari
Baburaj as "Royapuram" Kumar
R. K. Suresh as Ravi
Sriman as Baskar
Kalloori Vinoth as Chitti
Kabali Vishwanth as Guna
Hareesh Peradi as Settu Bhaskar
Jangiri Madhumitha as Manju
Sri Priyanka as Priya
Vela Ramamoorthy as Sketch's father
Aruldoss as Dorai, Sketch's uncle
Abhishek Vinod as Shakthivel
Meghali as Gayathri
Cheenu Mohan as Gayathri's father
Jeeva Ravi as Police Officer
Ravi Kishan
P. L. Thenappan
Poster Nandakumar
Krishnamoorthy
K. S. G. Venkatesh
Ankit as "Archi"
Vijay Chandar (special appearance in the song "Atchi Putchi")
Dastha (special appearance in the song "Atchi Putchi")
Vijay Senathipathi (special appearance in the wedding groom)

Production
In November 2016, director Vijay Chandar, who had previously made Vaalu (2015), revealed that his next project would feature Vikram in the lead role. Produced by Silverline Film Factory, who had worked on an incomplete fantasy film titled Karikalan with Vikram during 2010, the film was widely reported to be a remake of the American film, Don't Breathe (2016). Denying the reports, Vijay Chandar later clarified that it was an original script and the film would be set in North Chennai. M. Sukumar was selected as cinematographer, while S. Thaman collaborated with Vijay Chander again despite reports that Anirudh Ravichander was set to be signed.

Sai Pallavi was signed to play the lead actress in the project, marking her first leading role in Tamil films. She later opted out of the film and returned her advance in late February 2017, citing scheduling issues with her work on the Tamil language remake of the Malayalam film Charlie (2015) directed by A. L. Vijay. She was later replaced by Tamannaah, who stated it was "liberating to see a strong storyline in a commercial pot-boiler". Actors Ravi Kishan, R. K. Suresh and Radharavi were selected to portray antagonists in the film. Actor Vishwanath, who had a breakthrough role in Pa. Ranjith's Kabali (2016), was signed on to play a supporting role in the film, with Vijay Chander requesting the actor to take reference of Kalaiyarasan's role in Madras (2014) for his particular character. Actress Sri Priyanka, previously seen as the lead actress in small budget films, was also selected to portray second lead actress in the film.

Following a period of delay, the film began its shoot at Binny Mills in Chennai during early February 2017, with Vikram choosing to simultaneously work on the project alongside his commitments for Gautham Vasudev Menon's spy thriller Dhruva Natchathiram (2017). The film's title, Sketch, was revealed to the media in April 2017. The shoot of the film was completed in August 2017, after which the makers began the promotional campaign.

Music 

The soundtrack and background music of Sketch are scored by S. Thaman. Five songs have been released from the film as singles, after being released by other composers.

Release 
Sketch was released on 12 January 2018 coinciding with the week of Thai Pongal and clashing with another major release, Thaanaa Serndha Koottam and Gulaebaghavali.

The film was later dubbed and released in Telugu, Hindi, and Bengali. The Hindi dubbed version was released in theatres by Goldmines Telefilms on 3 August 2018 and the Bengali dubbed version was also released by Goldmines Telefilms in 2019.

References

External links
 
 

2018 action films
2010s Tamil-language films
Films scored by Thaman S
2018 films
Indian action films